In Canada, motor vehicle licence plates are issued by the transportation department in each province and territory. Since 2002, most provinces and territories have introduced special licence plates for veterans of the Canadian Armed Forces or other allied militaries. The only territory that does not have a veteran licence plate is Nunavut. Common design features of these veteran licence plate include the image of a red poppy or the word "veteran". Only veteran licence plates issued by the Northwest Territories do not have any of the features mentioned above.

Introduction dates

Ontario
In Ontario, the Ministry of Transportation issued 27,000 veteran licence plates since 2003. Veterans can order a special licence plate with the format "000 VET" for display or gift purposes.

Québec
As of the 4th of May 2009, Québec now offers a veteran motorcycle plate.

Alberta
In Alberta, 15,750 veteran licence plates have been issued since 2005.

Appearance

Eligibility
The licence plates are available to those who served as a member of Canadian Forces, the Commonwealth of Nations, or its wartime allies. People who served on North Atlantic Treaty Organization (NATO) missions, peacekeeping missions as members of the Canadian Forces or United Nations forces, or the Royal Canadian Mounted Police (RCMP) are also eligible. They need to provide a Canadian Forces Certificate of Service and a Canadian Forces Identification Card as proof of service. Those who have served three years (may still be serving) can also apply.

In British Columbia, veterans who operate trucks, vans, and motorcycle are also eligible to obtain a veteran licence plate in that province.

In New Brunswick, reservists who formerly served must provide acceptable documentation displaying at least 3 years of service for Canada to be eligible for Veteran status plates.

References

veteran
Veterans' affairs in Canada